Traver may refer to:

People
 Álvaro Traver (born 1993), Spanish footballer
 Andrew L. Traver, U.S. Government administrator
 Daniel Gimeno Traver (born 1985), Spanish professional tennis player
 Harry Traver (1877–1961), American engineer and roller coaster designer
 Jay Traver (1894–1974), American entomologist
 William R. Traver (1818–????), American politician

Places
 Traver, California, United States, a census-designated place
 Traver House, a historic home in Rhinebeck, New York, United States
 J. E. Traver Farm, a historic home and farm complex in Rhinebeck, New York, United States
 John H. Traver Farm, a historic home and farm complex in Württemberg, New York, United States

See also
 Travers (disambiguation)